Acrossocheilus yunnanensis is a species of cyprinid fish. It occurs in eastern Yunnan province in China.

References

Yunnanensis
Freshwater fish of China
Endemic fauna of Yunnan
Fish described in 1904
Taxa named by Charles Tate Regan